Liucun Town is a town in Changping District, Beijing, China. Located in the eastern foothill of the Taihang Mountain Range, Liucun shares border with Nankou Town to its northeast, Yangfang and Machikou Town to its east, Sujiatuo and Miaofengshan Towns to its southeast, Yanchi Town to its southwest, and Ruiyunguan Township to its northwest. , it had 18,139 residents under its administration.

History

Administrative divisions 
In 2021, 28 villages constitued Liucun Town. They are listed below:

Gallery

See also 
 List of township-level divisions of Beijing

References 

Towns in Beijing
Changping District